This is a timeline documenting events of Jazz in the year 1972.

Events

April
 21
 Grant Green records Live at the Lighthouse at the Lighthouse Café in Hermosa Beach, California.

June
 10 – The very first Moers Festival started in Moers, Germany (June 10 – 11).
 16 – The 6th Montreux Jazz Festival started in Montreux, Switzerland (June 16 – August 20).
 29 – The 19th Newport Jazz Festival started in Newport, Rhode Island (June 29 – July 8).

September
 15 – The 15th Monterey Jazz Festival started in Monterey, California (September 15 – 17).

Album releases

Neil Ardley: Symphony of Amaranths
Gato Barbieri: Bolivia (album)
Paul Bley: Open, to Love
Anthony Braxton
Donna Lee
Saxophone Improvisations
Town Hall 1972
Gary Burton: Alone at Last
Ornette Coleman: Skies of America
Chick Corea: Return To Forever
Miles Davis: On The Corner
Bill Evans: Living Time (with George Russell)
Gunter Hampel
Angel (Gunter Hampel album)
Broadway
Familie (album)
Waltz For 11 Universes In A Corridor
Herbie Hancock: Crossings (album)
Julius Hemphill: Dogon AD
Joe Henderson: Black Is The Color
Keith Jarrett
Expectations (Keith Jarrett album)
Facing You
Eric Kloss: One, Two, Free
David Liebman: Open Sky (album)
London Jazz Composers Orchestra: Ode (album)
Albert Mangelsdorff: Trombirds
Nucleus: Belladonna (album)
Oregon: Music Of Another Present Era
Annette Peacock: I'm the One
Jean-Luc Ponty: Sonata Erotica
John Surman: Westering Home
McCoy Tyner
Echoes of a Friend
Sahara (album)
Weather Report: I Sing the Body Electric
Randy Weston: Blue Moses
Stanley CowellIllusion Suite
Stanley ClarkeChildren of Forever
Gary BartzJuju Street Songs
Airto MoreiraFree
Charles EarlandCharles III
Stanley TurrentineCherry
Bucky PizzarelliGreen Guitar Blues

Deaths

 January
 27 – Mahalia Jackson, American singer (born 1911).

 February
 19 – Lee Morgan, American trumpeter, shot dead (born 1938).

 March
 13 – Clancy Hayes, American vocalist, banjoist and guitarist (born 1908).
 27 – Sharkey Bonano, American trumpeter, band leader, and vocalist (born 1904).

 April
 3 – Ferde Grofé, American composer, arranger, and pianist (born 1892).

 May
 5 – Reverend Gary Davis, American singer, banjoist, guitarist, and harmonica player (born 1896).

 June
 8 – Jimmy Rushing, American blues shouter, balladeer, singer, and pianist (born 1901).

 July
 3 – Marty Flax, American saxophonist (born 1924).
 10 – Lovie Austin, 84, American pianist, composer, and bandleader (born 1887).

 August
 5 – Mezz Mezzrow, American clarinetist and saxophonist (born 1899).
 9 – André Ekyan, French reedist (born 1907).
 20 – Mike Bryan, American guitarist (born 1916).
 24 – Don Byas, American tenor saxophonist (born 1912).
 31
 Hideo Shiraki, Japanese drummer and bandleader (born 1933).
 Dalva de Oliveira, Brazilian singer (internal bleeding) (born 1917).

 October
 13 – Phil Seamen, English drummer (born 1926).
 25 – Cal Massey, American trumpeter and composer (born 1928).

 November
 24 – Hall Overton, American composer and pianist (born 1920).

 December
 3 – Bill Johnson, African-American upright bassist (born 1872).
 5 – Kenny Dorham, American trumpeter, singer, and composer (born 1924).
 25 – Dud Bascomb, American trumpeter (born 1916).
 29 – Hayes Alvis, American upright bassist and tubist (born 1907).

Births

 January
 6 – Mina Agossi, French singer-songwriter.

 February
 1 – Siri Gjære, Norwegian singer.
 14 – Daniela Schaechter, Italian singer and pianist.

 March
 7 – Katrine Madsen, Danish singer.
 12 – Lisa Werlinder, Swedish actress and singer.
 14 – Noriko Ueda, Japanese upright bassist, pianist, singer, composer, and arranger.
 25 – Mimi Jones, American bassist, vocalist, composer, bandleader, and label director.

 April
 9 – Christos Rafalides, Greek vibraphonist, composer, and educator.
 15 – Christer Fredriksen, Norwegian guitarist.
 16 – Øyvind Nypan, Norwegian guitarist.

 May
 31 – Christian McBride, American upright bassist.

 July
 1 – Alex Machacek, Austrian jazz fusion guitarist.
 4 – Ketil Gutvik, Norwegian guitarist.
 29 – Roger Johansen, Norwegian drummer.

 August
 13 – Oscar Peñas, Catalan-American guitarist and composer.
 21 – Nino Katamadze, Georgian singer.

 September
 12 – Gerard Presencer, English trumpeter.
 27 – Lindha Kallerdahl, Swedish singer, multi-instrumentalist, and composer.

 October
 2 – John Daversa, American trumpeter and composer.
 11 – Federico Ughi, Italian drummer and composer.
 12 – Eugene Ball, Australian composer and trumpeter.

 November
 5 – Neil Cowley, English pianist.

 December
 2 – Pasquale Stafano, Italian jazz pianist, composer, and arranger.
 5 – Stefano Bollani, Italian composer, pianist, and singer.
 7 – Thomas Strønen, Norwegian drummer.

 Unknown date
 Anders Christensen, Danish upright bassist.
 Ari Poutiainen, Finnish violinist, violist, composer, and researcher.
 Jay Soto, American guitarist.
 Meriç Yurdatapan, Turkish singer.
 Morten Lund, Danish drummer.

See also

 1970s in jazz
 List of years in jazz
 1972 in music

References

External links 
 History Of Jazz Timeline: 1972 at All About Jazz

Jazz
Jazz by year